Hilltop High School (HHS) is a public junior/senior high school located in Whitecourt, Alberta, Canada providing education to students in grades 9 through 12.

References

External links 

High schools in Alberta
Whitecourt
Educational institutions in Canada with year of establishment missing